Veto is an unincorporated community in Washington County, in the U.S. state of Ohio.

History
A post office was established at Veto in 1850, and remained in operation until 1902.

References

Unincorporated communities in Washington County, Ohio
Unincorporated communities in Ohio